Robert Leo Donovan (20 June 1899, in Dublin – 26 February 1932, in Dublin) was an Irish cricketer. A left-handed batsman and left-arm medium pace bowler, he played just once for the Ireland cricket team, a first-class match against Scotland in August 1921, scoring three runs in the only innings, and not bowling.

His father, EJ Donovan, also represented Ireland at cricket.

References

1899 births
1932 deaths
Irish cricketers
Cricketers from County Dublin